Kaarle Oskari Knuutila (7 December 1868, Vampula - 29 April 1949) was a Finnish farmer and politician. He was a member of the Parliament of Finland from 1907 to 1908 and again from 1910 to 1913, representing the Finnish Party.

References

1868 births
1949 deaths
People from Huittinen
People from Turku and Pori Province (Grand Duchy of Finland)
Finnish Party politicians
Members of the Parliament of Finland (1907–08)
Members of the Parliament of Finland (1910–11)
Members of the Parliament of Finland (1911–13)